St. Paul's Commons (formerly the Cathedral Center of St. Paul) is the administrative and ministry hub of the six-county Episcopal Diocese of Los Angeles.

Its central church is home to the Congregation of St. Athanasius, which dates from 1864 and is the oldest Episcopal Church in Southern California, and the oldest continuing Episcopal Church in Los Angeles. The congregation conducts services in English, Korean, and Spanish. The congregation is named for Athanasius, the 4th-century Bishop of Alexandria known for his ministry in a widely secular society. The Cathedral Center was built on the site of the old St. Athanasius church building. Frank M. Alton is Provost.

Site and functions
Located in the Echo Park district near downtown Los Angeles, the Cathedral Center houses community-outreach programs ranging from the Episcopal Community Federal Credit Union to the weekly food distribution program. Part of the Episcopal Church, the Cathedral Center also houses the offices of the bishops and Cathedral Center staff and regularly hosts retreats and other events for Episcopal-affiliated and community groups.

The Cathedral Center was consecrated October 22, 1994, on its current site, 840 Echo Park Avenue, where Episcopal parish ministry has been conducted since 1917.

Previous diocesan administrative buildings have included St. Paul's Cathedral, built in 1923 on Figueroa Street north of Wilshire Boulevard and demolished in 1980 after earthquake damage; St. Paul's Pro-Cathedral, built in 1883 on Olive Street and sold in 1922 to make way for the Biltmore Hotel; and the original 1865 St. Athanasius' Church, located on New High Street and Temple, just northeast of L.A.'s current City Hall.

Current status
In 2008, Bruno established "one cathedral ministry in two locations" upon designating St. John's Church, 514 W. Adams Boulevard in Los Angeles, as the Pro-Cathedral of the Diocese of Los Angeles. Built in 1925 and a city landmark, St. John's Pro-Cathedral serves the diocese as the site of larger liturgical gatherings.

Both the Cathedral Center of St. Paul and the Pro-Cathedral of St. John have vibrant music ministries and feature distinctive pipe organs. An earlier instrument, the 1911 Murray Harris organ built for St. Paul's Pro-Cathedral, now serves St. James in-the-City Episcopal Church, 3903 Wilshire Boulevard.

Sources
 The Diocese of Los Angeles: A Brief History, by Stephen C. Clark
 The Episcopal News, publication of the Diocese of Los Angeles

Paul Los Angeles
Christianity in Los Angeles
Paul, Los Angeles
Episcopal church buildings in California
Episcopal church buildings in Los Angeles